Vincenzo Vannutelli (5 December 1836 – 9 July 1930) was an Italian prelate of the Roman Catholic Church. He spent his career in the foreign service of the Holy See and was made a cardinal in 1890.

At his death he was the oldest member of the College of Cardinals, the last surviving cardinal elevated to that rank during the 19th century, and the next to last surviving cardinal named by Pope Leo XIII.

His older brother Serafino (1834–1915) was also a cardinal.

Biography
Vincenzo Vannutelli was born in Genazzano, Diocese of Palestrina, Lazio. He studied at the Collegium Capranica and the Pontifical Gregorian University. He was ordained a priest on 23 December 1860 and spent several years as a seminary faculty member.

Most of his early career was in Roman and at foreign postings of the Secretariat of State, aside from two years starting in 1878 when he was an Auditor of the Roman Rota.

On 23 January 1880 he was named Titular Archbishop of Sardes and Apostolic Delegate to the Ottoman Empire. He was consecrated a bishop on 2 February 1880 by Cardinal Giovanni Simeoni.

In December 1889 Pope Leo XIII named him a cardinal in pectore, i.e., secretly. His appointment was publicly announced at a consistory in 1890, where he was named Cardinal-Priest of San Silvestro in Capite. His elevation to the rank of cardinal was an exception to a rule established in 1586 that barred the pope from naming a cardinal's brother a cardinal. Vincenzo's brother Serafino (1834–1915) had been made a cardinal in 1887 and was still living.

Vannutelli became prefect of the economy of the Sacred Congregation for the Propagation of the Faith in 1892 and held that position for ten years. On 16 December 1896 he was named Archpriest of the Basilica di Santa Maria Maggiore.

He became Cardinal-Bishop of Palestrina in 1900. With Cardinal Pietro Gasparri he was one of the principals responsible for the codification of canon law begun by Pope Pius X in 1904 and completed thirteen years later. Vannutelli also served as prefect of the Commission for the Revision of the Provincial Councils from 1902 until 1908, which was charged with interpreting the documents of past councils according to recent papal rulings.

He participated in three conclaves, that of 1903 which elected Pope Pius X, that of 1914 which elected Pope Benedict XV, and that of 1922 which elected Pope Pius XI.

In 1906, he reported receiving a blackmail letter threatening to publish compromising letters he was said to have written if the sender was not paid 1,000 lire. He notified the police, and a man was arrested.

He succeeded his brother Serafino as Dean of the College of Cardinals in 1915. From this position, in 1923 he said of Mussolini that «for his energy and devotion to the country he was chosen to save the nation and restore her fortune»; these words caused stir in Italy, and were interpreted inside and outside the country as a Vatican approval of the Fascist Regime.

He died in Rome on 9 July 1930.

Honours 
 1878: Grand Cordon in the Order of Leopold

Notes

References

External links
 Biography

1836 births
1930 deaths
People from Genazzano
Deans of the College of Cardinals
20th-century Italian cardinals
Cardinals created by Pope Leo XIII
Cardinal-bishops of Ostia
Cardinal-bishops of Palestrina
Apostolic Nuncios to Brazil
Members of the Sacred Congregation of the Council
Prefects of the Apostolic Signatura
Pontifical Gregorian University alumni
Almo Collegio Capranica alumni
Recipients of the Order of the White Eagle (Poland)